Karl Allgöwer (born 5 January 1957) is a German former footballer who played as a midfielder. He played most of his career at VfB Stuttgart, winning the Bundesliga in 1984. Allgöwer was part of the German silver squad for the 1986 FIFA World Cup.

Club career
Growing up in Geislingen an der Steige, Allgöwer completed his youth years with SV Altenstadt and SC Geislingen before moving to Stuttgart to score 59 goals for 2. Bundesliga team Stuttgarter Kickers from 1977 to 1980 as striker. Local rival VfB Stuttgart paid Kickers 750,000 Deutsche Mark to team him up with their Bundesliga squad. Just a few matches for them, he got selected for the B-international team of Germany, impressing as a goalscoring midfielder. His immediate progress earned him a call-up from Jupp Derwall for Germany. In Hanover they faced France in November 1980 and Allgöwer was having a bright debut, playing on the right in midfield and cementing his ambitions. Subsequent to him taking part regularly for Germany on their way to the 1982 FIFA World Cup, his participation in that tournament was expected. However, Allgöwer retired from playing for West Germany before the World Cup.

Allgöwer's international retirement of 1982 lasted for three years. Three years in which he once won the Bundesliga title with Stuttgart (in 1984) and in which he massively expanded his importance for his club. Franz Beckenbauer, successor of Jupp Derwall at the helm of the German team in 1984, attempted to lure the strong shooting player out of that retirement, but Beckenbauer had to wait until October 1985 to see Allgöwer return for the World Cup qualifier against Portugal (0–1), which ironically took place at VfB Stuttgart's Neckarstadion. He kept on for West Germany then, declaring his final international retirement after staying unused in the 1986 FIFA World Cup runner-up campaign of Germany. He collected 10 caps.

On club level he remained a key player for his sole team, switching to a sweeper role later on. Karl's brother Ralf also played a few matches for Stuttgart in these years, but never gaining the status Karl had for his coaches and the Stuttgart supporters. In 1989 the powerful free-kick specialist was part of the Stuttgart XI with Guido Buchwald and Jürgen Klinsmann that got defeated by Diego Maradona's SSC Napoli in the UEFA Europa League final. After 338 Bundesliga matches Allgöwer said farewell to the German top division in the summer of 1991.



Honours

International
West Germany
 FIFA World Cup: Runner-up 1986

Club
VfB Stuttgart
 UEFA Europa League: Runner-up 1988–89
 Bundesliga: 1983–84
 DFB-Pokal: Runner-up 1985–86

References

External links
 
 

1957 births
Living people
People from Göppingen (district)
Sportspeople from Stuttgart (region)
German footballers
Germany international footballers
West German footballers
Germany B international footballers
Stuttgarter Kickers players
VfB Stuttgart players
1986 FIFA World Cup players
Bundesliga players
2. Bundesliga players
Association football midfielders
Footballers from Baden-Württemberg
Recipients of the Order of Merit of Baden-Württemberg